Captain Wacky is:
 A nickname for Paul Keating, a former Prime Minister of Australia
 Purportedly the original name for Homer Simpson of The Simpsons according to "The Simpsons 138th Episode Spectacular"